is a train station in Ikeda, Nakagawa District, Hokkaido, Japan.

Lines
Hokkaido Railway Company
Nemuro Main Line Station K36

Adjacent stations

Railway stations in Hokkaido Prefecture
Railway stations in Japan opened in 1904